Sekolah Jenis Kebangsaan (Cina) Katholik（）, is a state primary school located at Gajah Berang Road in Malacca City.

History 
The high school department was established on January 4, 1958, named St. Francis Chinese High School. He pointed out that in 1960, in order to achieve the goal of all boys, the school stopped enrolling girls, and then becomes Catholic School. In the 1980s, the school had around 1,000 students.

Difficulty 
The school faced the declination in students number.

References 

Primary schools in Malaysia
Schools in Malacca
Chinese-language schools in Malaysia
Educational institutions established in 1928
1928 establishments in British Malaya